Big Event Golf is a golf arcade game released by Taito in 1986.

The player is a participant on an 18-hole championship golf course. The objective is to acquire the lowest score possible. The rules used in this game are the same as in actual golf.

Reception 
In Japan, Game Machine listed Big Event Golf on their April 15, 1986 issue as being the third most-successful table arcade unit of the month.

References

1986 video games
Arcade video games
Arcade-only video games
Golf video games
North America-exclusive video games
Taito arcade games
Trackball video games
Video games developed in Japan